Goldwin Corlett Elgie (July 21, 1896 – April 4, 1975) was a lawyer and political figure in Ontario. He represented Woodbine in the Legislative Assembly of Ontario from 1934 to 1943 and from 1945 to 1948 as a Conservative and then Progressive Conservative member.

He was born in Dresden, the son of George Albert Elgie and Margaret Elizabeth Corlett, and was educated in Dresden, at Albert College, University of Western Ontario and Osgoode Hall. In 1921, he married Vivian Granger McHenry.

In 1937, Elgie proposed legislation that would have allowed passengers to sue a driver for negligence in the event of an accident. The proposed bill was rejected by the Liberal government of the time.

His son Robert also served in the Ontario assembly. He died in Toronto in 1975.

References

External links

1896 births
1975 deaths
Progressive Conservative Party of Ontario MPPs
University of Western Ontario alumni
Osgoode Hall Law School alumni